The 2012 North Carolina Attorney General election was held on November 6, 2012, concurrently with the other elections to the Council of State and the gubernatorial election. Incumbent Democratic State Attorney General Roy Cooper won re-election to a fourth term unopposed.

Democratic primary

Candidates

Declared
 Roy Cooper, incumbent Attorney General

Republican primary
No members of the North Carolina Republican Party filed to challenge Cooper.

General election

Results

Footnotes

2012 North Carolina elections
2012
North Carolina